Yacharam is a village in Ranga Reddy district of the Indian state of Telangana. It is located in Yacharam mandal of Ibrahimpatnam revenue division. The Yacharam Police Station is a part of the law and order of the region.

Geography 

References 

Villages in Ranga Reddy district